Caught Red Handed is an American reality television series that portrays reenactments of shoplifting crimes on truTV that debuted on November 5, 2012.

Premise
Caught Red Handed takes a close look at the daily life of loss-prevention agents as they apprehend shoplifting suspects.  In May 2012, the producers issued a casting call for actors to portray shoplifters on the show. At the end of each show, the credits reveal that the show consists of "reenactments inspired by true events."

Episodes

Season 1 (2013)

Note: Episodes are not broadcast in truTV episode number order.

Lawsuit
truTV was sued on October 30, 2012 for allegedly stealing the idea from Harry Dunn and Steven Bloch. Despite the lawsuit, the series finished its eight-episode run. Thereafter, the show was cancelled.

References

External links
 Official Page
 
 
 Caught Red Handed on TV.com

2010s American reality television series
2012 American television series debuts
2013 American television series endings
English-language television shows
TruTV original programming
Theft